Following is a list of senators of Vaucluse, people who have represented the department of Vaucluse in the Senate of France.

Third Republic

Senators for Vaucluse under the French Third Republic were:

 Frédéric Granier (1876–1882)
 Elzéar Pin (1876–1883)
 Alphonse Gent (1882–1894)
 Alfred Joseph Naquet (1883–1890)
 Eugène Guérin (1890–1920)
 Georges Taulier (1894–1899)
 Auguste Béraud (1900–1905)
 Achille Maureau (1905–1920)
 Louis Serre (1920–1936)
 Louis Tissier (1920–1936)
 Ulysse Fabre (1936–1940)
 Louis Gros (1936–1940)

Fourth Republic

Senators for Vaucluse under the French Fourth Republic were:

 Lucien Grangeon (1946–1948)
 Jean Geoffroy (1948–1959)
 Marcel Pellenc (1948–1959)

Fifth Republic 
Senators for Vaucluse under the French Fifth Republic:

References

Sources

 
Lists of members of the Senate (France) by department